Lamida moncusalis, the cashew shoot and blossom webber, is a species of snout moth in the genus Lamida. It was described by Francis Walker in 1859. It is found in India.

The larvae feed on cashew and mango. They web the terminal portions of the new shoots and the blossom, causing the shoots to dry up. The larvae are dark green with yellow longitudinal bands and pinkish dorsal lines. Full-grown larvae reach a length 24–27 mm. Pupation takes place in a cocoon made within the leaf web.

References

External links
 

Moths described in 1859
Epipaschiinae